Wanniyala hakgala is a species of spider of the genus Wanniyala. It is endemic to Sri Lanka. The species was described with a male found from Hakgala area, hence the specific name.

Description
Male of species is differentiated by its counterpart species Wanniyala agrabopath by epigynum with pointed projection, ochre-yellow carapace with wide blackish median band with lateral dark margins. Opisthosoma grey with black pattern dorsally and dark patterns ventrally as well. Sternum is light brown in color, while legs are pale ochre-yellow. Female is much similar to male, but with an unmodified clypeus.

Distribution
Exclusively endemic to central hills of Sri Lanka, the species is found only from three localities around Nuwara Eliya district and Kandy district. The type locality is from Hakgala, and the two other sites are from Kumbukana and Nonawatte wet slope.

See also
 List of Pholcidae species

References

Pholcidae
Endemic fauna of Sri Lanka
Spiders of Asia
Spiders described in 2005